Karna Solskjær is a Norwegian footballer who plays as a forward for AaFK Fortuna.

Career

Solskjær started her career with Norwegian fourth tier side Clausenengen. After that, she signed for Manchester United in the English top flight. In 2022, Solskjær signed for Norwegian second tier club AaFK Fortuna.

Personal life

She is the daughter of Norway international Ole Gunnar Solskjær.

References

Expatriate women's footballers in England
Living people
Manchester United W.F.C. players
Norwegian expatriate women's footballers
Norwegian expatriate sportspeople in England
Norwegian women's footballers
Women's association footballers not categorized by position
Year of birth missing (living people)